Atakent is a village in the Adıyaman District, Adıyaman Province, Turkey. Its population is 729 (2021). Before the 2013 reorganisation, it was a town (belde).

References

Villages in Adıyaman District